Pamela Gale Malhotra is an American animal sanctuary owner who lives in India. She was awarded India's highest award for women, the Nari Shakti Puraskar for her work at the SAI Sanctuary.

Life
Pamela Gale was born in about 1952 in Red Bank, New Jersey She met and married an Indian restaurant owner while she was working at an all-night cafe. On their honeymoon in Hawaii they decided to buy land there. She went to work for a pharmaceutical company whilst they shared their dream of owning a forest and her husband went into the mortgage business. They lived off one person's wages whilst her husband's sales commissions were saved to buy land in Hawaii.

They decided to leave Hawaii and use their funds in India. The couple first went to the Himalayas, but they were only allowed to buy 12 acres so they came south to start the SAI (Save Animals Initiative) Sanctuary Trust.

The wildlife on their sanctuary includes Bengal Tigers, Asian Elephants, Hyena, Wild Boar, Leopards, Sambhar and the Giant Malabar squirrel.

On International Women's Day in 2017, she was in New Delhi where she was awarded the Nari Shakti Puraskar by President Pranab Mukherjee at the Rashtrapati Bhavan. Each of the awardees received a citation and 100,000 rupees.

References 

Living people
1952 births
People from Red Bank, New Jersey
American conservationists
Indian conservationists
Nari Shakti Puraskar winners